Tsui Hsiao-ping (1922/23 – 11 March 2017) was a Taiwanese radio personality and director.

Tsui was born in Jinan, China as the daughter of a postal worker. Her family was forced to move away from their home due to the Second Sino-Japanese War. She studied at Sichuan's Sixth Middle School in Deyang and later attended National Drama College. Tsui arrived in Taiwan as a member of the touring Shanghai Audience Company in late 1947. When the Kuomintang retreated to Taiwan in 1949, Tsui found it impossible to return to China. Subsequently, she began working for China Broadcasting Company in Taiwan. Her Broadcast Drama, on the air weekly on Sunday evenings, became immensely popular. In 1968, Tsui was arrested and charged with colluding with the Chinese Communist Party. Sentenced to fourteen years imprisonment, she was released in 1977. In 2000, she was honored with the Golden Bell Award for Special Lifetime Achievement. The next year, Tsui published a memoir.

Over the course of her career, Tsui taught at National Taiwan University of Arts, Shih Hsin University, and National Taiwan College of Performing Arts.

Tsui died in 2017, aged 94, at National Taiwan University Hospital in Taipei.

References

External links

1920s births
2017 deaths
Taiwanese radio presenters
Taiwanese women radio presenters
Radio directors
Taiwanese people from Shandong
Chinese Civil War refugees
Academic staff of Shih Hsin University
Taiwanese prisoners and detainees
Prisoners and detainees of Taiwan
Taiwanese memoirists
Taiwanese women writers
Writers from Jinan
Women memoirists
Women radio directors
Academic staff of the National Taiwan University of Arts